The 2010–11 Macedonian Second Football League was the nineteenth season since its establishment. It began on 8 August 2010 and ended on 29 May 2011.

Participating teams

League table

Results

Promotion playoff

See also
2010–11 Macedonian Football Cup
2010–11 Macedonian First Football League
2010–11 Macedonian Third Football League

References

External links
Football Federation of Macedonia
MacedonianFootball.com

Macedonia 2
2
Macedonian Second Football League seasons